Alfred Claeys-Boúúaert may refer to:

 Alfred Claeys-Boúúaert (senator) (1844–1936), Belgian lawyer and politician
 Alfred Claeys-Boùùaert (colonial administrator)  (1906–1993), Belgian lawyer, colonial administrator and diplomat